Pivot is a United States  rock band from Raleigh, North Carolina featuring Brian Kelly on vocals, Eric Hambright on guitar, Mike Hambright on bass, and Phil Cicco on drums.

Discography
1999 - Self Titled EP
2003 - Simple Machines
2006 - The Dream
2009 - 5 Days
2012 - Enter the Exosphere

American progressive rock groups